Acriflavine (INN: acriflavinium chloride) is a topical antiseptic. It has the form of an orange or brown powder. It may be harmful in the eyes or if inhaled. It is a dye and it stains the skin and may irritate. The hydrochloride form is more irritating than the neutral form.
It is derived from acridine.  Commercial preparations are often mixtures with proflavine. It is known by a variety of commercial names.

Uses

Medical use
Acriflavine was developed in 1912 by Paul Ehrlich, a German medical researcher, and was used during the First World War against sleeping sickness and as a topical antiseptic.

Other uses
Acriflavine is used in biochemistry for fluorescently labeling high molecular weight RNA.

It is used as treatment for external fungal infections of aquarium fish.

Research
In an animal model, acriflavine has been shown to inhibit HIF-1, which prevents blood vessels growing to supply tumors with blood and interferes with glucose uptake and use.

Acriflavine might be effective in fighting common cold virus, and also aid the fight against increasingly antibiotic resistant bacteria  because it can cure (remove) plasmids containing antimicrobial resistance genes from Gram positive bacteria.

Since 2014, acriflavine has been undergoing testing as an antimalarial drug to treat parasites with resistance to quinine and modern anti-parasitic medicines.

Legal status

Australia
Acriflavine is a controlled substance in Australia and dependent on situation, is considered either a Schedule 5 (Caution) or Schedule 7 (Dangerous Poison) substance. The use, storage and preparation of the chemical is subject to strict state and territory laws.

References

External links

ChemExper Chemical Directory

Antiseptics
Quaternary ammonium compounds
Acridine dyes
Chlorides